Ronald Schneider may refer to:

Ronnie Schneider, a business manager for several Rock and Roll acts.
Ronald Schneider, a professor at Queens College and a scholar of Latin America.

See also
Roy Schneider, an American actor known for his role in Jaws.